Wheeleria sobeidae is a moth of the family Pterophoridae. It is found in Iran, Afghanistan and Turkey.

The wings, head, thorax and abdomen are dirty white.

References

Moths described in 1981
Pterophorini
Moths of the Middle East
Moths of Asia